Orphanodendron is a genus of legume in the family Fabaceae.

Species
Orphanodendron comprises the following species:
 Orphanodendron bernalii Barneby and Grimes

 Orphanodendron grandiflorum Castellanos & G. P. Lewis

References

Caesalpinioideae
Taxonomy articles created by Polbot
Taxa named by James Walter Grimes
Taxa named by Rupert Charles Barneby
Fabaceae genera